Hudson Valley Mall is an enclosed shopping mall located in Ulster, New York, north of Kingston, United States. It is the lone mall in Ulster County and is the only enclosed mall located between Poughkeepsie and Albany. Hull Property Group currently owns and operates Hudson Valley Mall. The mall currently maintains a Dick's Sporting Goods, and Target, as well as a handful of specialty stores. Adjacent to the mall is Hudson Valley Plaza, a two-tiered complex on a west-facing hill, consisting mainly of a Walmart, PetSmart and a few other shops.

History
The Hudson Valley Mall opened in 1981 with a Kmart, JCPenney, Hess's, and a Hoyts six-screen theater named Cinema 6 (later expanded to 12 screens and renamed after Regal Cinemas bought the theater).

An expansion during 1989 added a Sears to the east side of the mall as well as a new food court and approximately 15 other stores.

In 1995 Hess's became Filene's.
In spring 2000, Pyramid began a renovation of the mall's interior. Around this time it was rumored a high-end department store would join the mall.  Best Buy joined the mall in 2000 and a Dick's Sporting Goods opened in 2001. Target built a new store adjacent to the space, which was also opened in 2001. On September 9, 2006, Filene's became Macy's.

The later 2010's saw multiple classic chain anchors readjust their brick and mortar fleets after being disrupted by digital retailers in recent years.

In 2016, Macy's, which maintains much larger locations around Albany and Poughkeepsie, announced they were leaving the center.

In 2018, it was announced that Sears would close.

Incidents

2005 mall shooting
On February 13, 2005, Robert Bonelli, age 24, of Glasco, New York, entered the mall with a  semi-automatic AK-47 Variant and began firing it in the mall's Best Buy shop. Panic ensued as employees and shoppers began to flee the mall. Bonelli moved into the mall's main corridor and continued firing his weapon until he ran out of ammunition. After emptying the assault rifle, he promptly dropped it. As Bonelli dropped the weapon, a mall employee grabbed his gun, and another tackled him. The mall was evacuated and Bonelli was taken into custody. No one was killed in the shooting, but two people, a 20-year-old National Guard recruiter and a 56-year-old male shopper, were wounded.

After the incident, Ulster County investigators searched Bonelli's room at the home he shared with his father, and found what Ulster County District Attorney Donald Williams described as "Columbine memorabilia". Officials described the young man as being fascinated by the Columbine High School massacre. Additional searches were conducted by police after videos seized at Bonelli's residence showed him exploding homemade pipe bombs with a man named Kenneth Stine and another individual. Both individuals were later arrested and charged with violating federal explosives laws.

Bonelli was taken to the Ulster County jail; on March 15, 2006, Bonelli pleaded guilty and on May 20, 2006 was sentenced to 32 years in the state prison (the maximum allowed by the guilty plea). He will be eligible for parole after 26 years.

2006 murder of Sharon Inger
Some time between closing time of the Ground Round restaurant in the mall on Saturday, June 3, and the morning of Sunday around 9:00 a.m., June 4, 2006, a suspect entered the Ground Round and stabbed a 42-year-old employee, named Sharon Inger, approximately 33 times. Inger, who worked as a night manager of the restaurant, was found early Sunday morning when another employee arrived to open the restaurant. $4000 was missing, according to night receipts. On September 21, 2006, police named Paul David Despres as the killer of Sharon Inger. Despres had begun employment with the Ground Round just a couple of weeks earlier. Investigators believe he went to the restaurant to steal his personnel file after giving a false name to police during a traffic stop earlier on the night of the murder, at around 11:00 p.m. Police believe he had a confrontation with Inger, grabbed a knife in the kitchen, and killed her at about 12:45 a.m. Two weeks later, Despres died after jumping, while intoxicated, from a vehicle after leaving a party.

See also

List of shopping malls in the United States

References

External links
Official Website
Pyramid Companies Profile
DeadMalls.Com Profile

Shopping malls in New York (state)
Shopping malls established in 1981
Buildings and structures in Ulster County, New York
Tourist attractions in Ulster County, New York
Shopping malls in the New York metropolitan area
Hull Property Group